Bastien Toma (born 24 June 1999) is a Swiss professional footballer who plays as a midfielder for  Belgian club Jong Genk.

Early life
Toma was born in Sion, Switzerland to Kosovo Albanian parents from Kabaš, Vitina.

Club career

Sion
In 2015 Toma signed his first professional contract with Swiss Super League side Sion after agreeing to a five-year deal. On 4 November 2017, he made his debut in a 1–1 home draw against Zurich after being named in the starting line-up.

Paços de Ferreira
On 31 August 2022, Toma was loaned to Paços de Ferreira in Portugal, with an option to buy.

Return to Genk
On 31 January 2023, Toma was recalled from loan and assigned to the reserve squad Jong Genk which plays in the second-tier Challenger Pro League.

Career statistics

Club

Honours
Genk
Belgian Cup: 2020–21

References

External links

1999 births
Swiss people of Kosovan descent
People from Sion, Switzerland
Sportspeople from Valais
Living people
Swiss men's footballers
Association football midfielders
Switzerland youth international footballers
Switzerland under-21 international footballers
FC Sion players
K.R.C. Genk players
FC St. Gallen players
F.C. Paços de Ferreira players
Jong Genk players
Swiss Promotion League players
Swiss Super League players
Belgian Pro League players
Primeira Liga players
Swiss expatriate footballers
Swiss expatriate sportspeople in Belgium
Expatriate footballers in Belgium
Swiss expatriate sportspeople in Portugal
Expatriate footballers in Portugal